Garautha is a constituency of the Uttar Pradesh Legislative Assembly covering the city of Garautha in the Jhansi district of Uttar Pradesh, India.

Garautha is one of five assembly constituencies in the Jalaun Lok Sabha constituency. Since 2008, this assembly constituency is numbered 225 amongst 403 constituencies.

Currently this seat belongs to Bharatiya Janta Party candidate Jawahar Lal Rajpoot who won in last Assembly election of 2022 Uttar Pradesh Legislative Elections defeating Samajwadi Party candidate Deep Narayan Singh (Deepak Yadav) by a margin of 33,662 votes.

Assembly Constituency

Election results

2022

References

External links
 

Assembly constituencies of Uttar Pradesh